The ONE is a shopping centre in Tsim Sha Tsui, Kowloon, Hong Kong. It is built on the site of the former Tung Ying Building at 100 Nathan Road. It was developed by Chinese Estates Holdings and opened in 2010. Owner Joseph Lau Luen-hung gifted the property to his wife in 2017.

History
The current site of The One used to be occupied by Tung Ying Building. During the economic recession in 2003, it was sold to Chinese Estates Holdings Limited for HK$1.1 Billion. The company then decided to spend HK$2.5 Billion for reconstruction of the whole building, construction work started to take place after demolishing it during August 2006. The One was completed on 16 June 2009.

Overview
It is erected vertically towards the sky consisting a variety of shops. It is one of the tallest retail only buildings in the world.

Exterior construction was topped out on 22 December 2009 and was completed in May 2010. The mall officially opened on 29 October that year.

Floor Layout
Apart from L16, The One is open to the public.

LG2

LG2 was originally named "Digital One Zone". When the mall first opened, it was leased to major tenants related to technology such as Fotomax. However, on 18 June 2011, the site changed to JUSCO MaxValu Prime supermarket.

LG1: Trends

When the shopping mall first opened, this floor was totally empty. It was not until December 2010 when stalls and temporary stalls were set up there. Fast food outlets were also set up, including Okinawa Route 58, The Cocoa Trees, and Tutti Frutti.

G-UG2: Fashion

L1-L3: Popular clothing and accessories

L1-L3's targeting group are females. Major tenants includes Cobo, Frmac Qui, Bla Bla Bra and Tee Locker. There are also two fast food outlets and also the Frozen Yogurt store Tuttimelon.

L4-L5: International Cuisine

There is a large variety of international cuisine on L4 and L5, but Asian cuisine in particular.

L6-L11: Lifestyle stores

L12-13: Restaurants

12th Floor: East Ocean Seafood Restaurant

13th Floor: Palace Wedding Chinese Restaurant

L16: Garden Terrace

The Garden Terrace covers over an area of  Its original intention was to let the public view the Hong Kong skyline, including Victoria Harbour, Tsim Sha Tsui and Kowloon East. But it wasn't long after completion when it was only leased for special occasions.

L17-L21: High-class Cuisine

Criticisms
Exterior LED Lights causing Light pollution

The Environmental Protection Department received 5 complaints about the strong LED lights from the exterior of The ONE, and not switching off until 4 am, causing nearby residents unable to sleep. The management company later on decided to switch off lights of the billboard on the southern side of The ONE at 9 pm and then the northern side at 11 pm.

Construction photos

References

External links

Official website

Shopping centres in Hong Kong
Tsim Sha Tsui